is a Japanese manga series written by Hiroyuki Takei and illustrated by Jet Kusamura. It is a spin-off of the original Shaman King manga by Takei. It was serialized in Kodansha's Shōnen Magazine Edge from April 2020 to June 2022 and was compiled into five volumes.

Publication
Shaman King: Marcos, written by Hiroyuki Takei and illustrated by Jet Kusamura, was serialized in Kodansha's Shōnen Magazine Edge from April 17, 2020, to June 17, 2022. Kodansha has collected its chapters into five tankōbon volumes. The first volume was released on August 17, 2020 and the last on August 17, 2022.

In January 2021, Kodansha USA announced that they have licensed the series for English digital release starting on March 9, 2021.

Volume list

References

External links
  
 

Kodansha manga
Shaman King
Shōnen manga